Jean Bouchéty (March 1, 1920, L'Étang-la-Ville — July 19, 2006) was a French musician, bassist, composer and conductor. He has composed several soundtracks.

Biography

Period jazz
In 1949, Jean Bouchéty was a double bass player in Geo Daly's jazz quartet, alongside Bernard Peiffer on piano and Roger Paraboschi on drums. They recorded the first 78 rpm by Geo Daly: "Nine O'Clock Jump" and "Moonglow" first with the Swing record label, then at Jazztime.

Conductor
Jean Bouchéty accompanied with his orchestra a certain number of French singers in studio recordings.
 1958: Hugues Aufray for the song "Le Poinçonneur des Lilas".
1959: Jean Philippe for the single whose song "Oui oui oui oui" represented France at the Eurovision Song Contest 1959.
 1960: José Bartel for the song "In the streets of Bahia".
1961: Eddy Mitchell for the two songs on the 100% rock disc which is the first record of Les Chaussettes Noires. "Betty" by Mitchell and Bouchéty. "La Bamba Rock" (a version of Ritchie Valens's "La Bamba" arranged by Bouchéty).
 1963: Claude François for several songs including "Dis-lui", "Walk Straight Ahead" and "I Would Like to Get Married".
 1964: Eddy Mitchell for several songs including "Always a Corner That Reminds Me"
 1964: Jean-Jacques Debout for the single including the songs "Our Fingers Crossed"
 1966: Éric Charden for the song "You Will not See Me" (texts by Bryan Mu, aka Eric Charden).
 1966: Eddy Mitchell for the album including "I Forgot to Forget It", "Société anonyme", "And Now", "What I'm Looking for is in You"
 1966: Michel Orso for the song "Angélique"
 1967: Michel Polnareff for the songs "Cuddly Soul", "The King of Ants", "Ta Ta Ta", "Under Which Star Am I Born?"
 1967: Éric Charden for "The World is Gray, the World is Blue"
 1967: Nicoletta for several songs including "Vis ta vie" and "Think of the Summer"
 1967: Jacqueline Taïeb for  "7 O'clock in the Morning"
 1967: Michel Fugain for "I Will Not Have Time"
 1968: Michel Fugain for the song "À nous deux Paris (Je pars)"
 1968: Jacqueline Dulac for the song "Le Printemps à Paris".
 1968: Nicoletta for several songs including "He Died the Sun" and "Live for Love"
 1968: Eddy Mitchell for several songs including "I Love You Only" and "I Seed the Wind"
 1970: Nicoletta for several songs including "La solitude ça existe pas"
 1970: Mireille Mathieu for the songs "C'est Dommage" and "C'est un peu la France"
 1971: Mireille Mathieu for the songs "Give Your Heart, Give Your Life", "I Do Not Know, Do Not Know", "You I Desire"
 1972: Michel Fugai] and The Big Bazaar. All songs including "Une belle histoire" and "Fais comme l'oiseau"
 1972: Daniel Guichard for the album including "La Tendresse" and "Do Not Cry Like That"
 1973: Éric Vincent for the songs "Sans famille" and "So Many Things"
 1974: Dalida for the song "He Had Just Turned 18"
 1976: Éric Vincent for the songs "A Country Somewhere" and "The Flowers Fade Between My Fingers"
 1980: Éric Vincent for the album "Harmoniques"
 1983: Éric Vincent for the album "Voyage for the Immediate"

Soundtracks 
Maurice Geoffrey and Jean Bouchéty Jean-François Boulet, Alfred Rode, conductor of the orchestra: Jean Bouchéty (Éditions Salvet)
 1965: Yoyo by Pierre Étaix, orchestration of Jean Bouchéty
 1966: The Game Is Over by Roger Vadim, music by Jean Bouchéty and Jean-Pierre Bourtayre
 1966: As Long as You've Got You're Health by Pierre Étaix, (as orchestrator)
 1973: I Don't Know Much, But I'll Say Everything by Pierre Richard, musical arrangement by Jean Bouchéty
 1975: Trop c'est trop by Didier Kaminka
 1976: Under the Doctor by Gerry Poulson
 1978: Lovelier than Love by Hans Dittmer
 1980: C'est Encore Loin L'Amerique? by Roger Coggio
 1980: Cherchez l'erreur by Serge Korber, music: Jean Bouchéty and Roger Candy
 1981: Belles, blondes et bronzées by Max Pecas, music: Jean Bouchéty and Roger Candy
 1981: Comment draguer toutes les filles by Michel Vocoret, music: Jean Bouchéty and Roger Candy
 1982: Le Bourgeois gentilhomme (based on the play of the same name by Molière) by Roger Coggio, music: Jean Bouchéty and Roger Candy

References

External links
 
 
 
 Disques de Jean Bouchéty

French composers
1920 births
2006 deaths